UWC Thailand International School, commonly referred to as UWC Thailand and abbreviated as UWCT is an independent, non-profit, international day and boarding school located at the foothills of Khao Phra Thaeo Wildlife Sanctuary, in Phuket, Thailand, and is the 16th member of the United World Colleges. The school was officially opened in 2016 by Queen Noor of Jordan, the current President of UWC (1995–present). UWC Thailand is authorized by IBO, a member of CIS, EARCOS and ISAT, and is affiliated with World Academy of Sport. The school offers a holistic, transformative, and rigorous International Baccalaureate continuum education from Nursery to Grade 12. The IB Primary Years Programme is provided for early childhood (Nursery, Preschool and Kindergarten), and primary school (grades 1–5), the IB Middle Years Programme for grades 6–10, and the IB Diploma Programme for grades 11–12. It is attended by approximately 500 students of over 60 nationalities.

UWC Thailand provides a challenging and rewarding educational experience by placing a high value on interdisciplinary, experiential and project based learning, community service and outdoor education. The school is also deeply committed to wellness and is considered UWC’s pioneer school in embedding wellbeing and mindfulness throughout its curriculum. These areas of focus are enshrined in the school’s motto, “Good Heart, Balanced Mind, Healthy Body”.

UWC Thailand is one of eighteen schools around the world in the UWC movement with the shared aim of "Making education a force to unite people, nations and cultures for peace and a sustainable future". To further this mission, UWC Thailand provides about US$3 million of scholarships annually, predominantly to support students selected by the UWC movement. The students are selected on the basis of their compassion, idealism and drive to make the world better and to fulfill the UWC mission. UWC movement was nominated for a Nobel Peace Prize in 2022.

The swimmer Aniqah Gaffoor is a student here. While she was here her training schedule for the 2020 Olympics started at 4:30 in the morning on every day but Sundays.

Gallery

References

Private schools in Thailand
Phuket province
Educational institutions established in 2009
International Baccalaureate schools in Thailand
Boarding schools in Thailand
2009 establishments in Thailand